Samuel Hyman Goldstein (January 6, 1945 – January 15, 1977) was an American sportsman and Paralympian.

He took two silver medals and one bronze in swimming at the 1964 Summer Paralympics, and one silver medal in table tennis at the 1964 Summer Paralympics.

He died at the age of 32, of Guillain–Barré syndrome two months after receiving a swine flu inoculation. His wife Margaret and his six-year-old son Craig received a then record high settlement of $906,781.

He was inducted to the Pennsylvania Wheelchair Hall of Fame in 1979.

He was inducted into the Philadelphia Jewish Sports Hall of Fame in 2008.

References

External links
 

1945 births
1977 deaths
American male swimmers
American male table tennis players
Paralympic swimmers of the United States
Paralympic table tennis players of the United States
Paralympic medalists in swimming
Paralympic medalists in table tennis
Paralympic silver medalists for the United States
Paralympic bronze medalists for the United States
People with Guillain–Barré syndrome
Wheelchair category Paralympic competitors
Swimmers at the 1964 Summer Paralympics
Table tennis players at the 1964 Summer Paralympics
Medalists at the 1964 Summer Paralympics
Swimmers from Philadelphia
American male freestyle swimmers